Justin K. Anderson (born April 15, 1988) is a former American football guard. He was selected in the seventh round, 208th overall, by the Indianapolis Colts in the 2012 NFL Draft. He played college football at Georgia. He now coaches his hometown high school team, the Irwin Indians.

Professional career

Indianapolis Colts
Anderson was selected in the seventh round in the 2012 NFL Draft by the Indianapolis Colts. On May 17, 2012, he signed his rookie contract. He began his rookie season on the Physically Unable to Perform (PUP) list and had to sit out the first six games of the season. On November 19, 2012, he was activated to the active roster from the PUP list. The next day, he was waived by the Colts. On November 21, 2012, Anderson was re-signed and placed on the practice squad. On January 7, 2013, he was signed to a Reserve/Future contract. On August 8, 2013, Anderson was waived/injured by the Colts. On August 9, 2013, he cleared waivers and was placed on the Colts' injured reserve list. On February 10, 2014, he was waived by the Colts.

Orlando Predators
On February 10, 2015, Anderson was assigned to the Orlando Predators of the Arena Football League.

References

External links
 Indianapolis Colts bio
 Georgia Bulldogs bio

1988 births
Living people
People from Ocilla, Georgia
Players of American football from Georgia (U.S. state)
American football offensive guards
American football offensive tackles
Georgia Bulldogs football players
Indianapolis Colts players
Orlando Predators players